Michelle Salt (born March 5, 1985) is a Canadian Paralympic Snowboarder. She was in a life-threatening motorcycle accident June 27, 2011 that left her on life support for seven days, broke numerous bones, having to endure many surgeries and in the end, lost her right leg above the knee. She is recently retired (2019) National team athlete for the Canada Snowboard para-team with 14 World Cup podiums. She was selected in February 2014 to compete in the 2014 Winter Paralympics in Sochi, Russia In 2018, she competed in the PyeongChang South Korea games finishing fourth and fifth. She is currently reigned National Champion in Canada and in January 2015, made her first World Cup Podium on home turf at Big White finishing 3rd. She is now a 14x World Cup Medalist. 

Michelle has also been very involved in the Fitness Industry and in November 2014, Michelle returned to the Fitness Stage competing in the NPAA. She is an advocate for Adaptive Wakesurfing.

References

External links
 
 
 
 

1985 births
Living people
Canadian female snowboarders
Paralympic snowboarders of Canada
Snowboarders at the 2014 Winter Paralympics
Snowboarders at the 2018 Winter Paralympics
Sportspeople from Edmonton